Aylsham ( or ) is a historic market town and civil parish on the River Bure in north Norfolk, England, nearly  north of Norwich.

The town is close to large estates and grand country houses at Blickling, Felbrigg, Mannington and Wolterton, which are important tourist attractions.

For the purposes of local government, the parish falls within the district of Broadland.

History

Archaeological evidence shows that the site of the town has been occupied since prehistoric times. Aylsham is just over two miles (3 km) from a substantial Roman settlement at Brampton, linked to Venta Icenorum at Caistor St Edmund, south of Norwich, by a Roman road which can still be traced in places – that site was a bustling industrial centre with maritime links to the rest of the empire. Excavations in the 1970s provided evidence of several kilns, showing that this was an industrial centre, pottery and metal items being the main items manufactured.

Aylsham is thought to have been founded around 500 AD by an Anglo Saxon thegn called Aegel, Aegel's Ham, meaning "Aegel's settlement". The town is mentioned in the Domesday Book of 1086 as Elesham and Ailesham, with a population of about 1,000. Until the 15th century, the linen and worsted industry was important here, as well as in North Walsham and Worstead and Aylsham webb or 'cloth of Aylsham' was supplied to the royal palaces of Edward II and III.

John of Gaunt was lord of the manor from 1372 and Aylsham became the principal town of the Duchy of Lancaster. Although John of Gaunt probably never came to Aylsham, the townspeople enjoyed many privileges, including exemption from jury service outside the manor and from payment of certain taxes. The village sign depicts John of Gaunt.

In 1519 Henry VIII granted a market on Saturdays and an annual fair to be held on 12 March, which was the eve of the feast of St Gregory the pope. Aylsham markets have always been an important feature of the town, and businesses developed to meet the needs of the town and the farming lands around it. Besides weekly markets there were cattle fairs twice a year and, in October, a hiring fair.

The historic Black Boys Inn in the Market Place is one of Aylsham's oldest surviving buildings, and has been on the site since the 1650s, although the present frontage dates to between 1710 and 1720. There is a frieze of small black boys on the cornice and a good staircase and assembly room. The Black Boys was a stop for the post coach from Norwich to Cromer, had stabling for 40 horses, and employed three ostlers and four postboys.

A thatched waterpump was built in 1911 at Carr's Corner in memory of John Soame by his uncle, a wealthy financier. An artesian well 170 feet (52 m) deep, its canopy is thatched in Norfolk reed.

As with many of the other market towns in the county, the weaving of local cloth brought prosperity to the town in medieval times. Until the 15th century it was the manufacture of linen which was the more important, and Aylsham linens and Aylsham canvases were nationally known. From the 16th century linen manufacture declined and wool became more important, a situation that continued until the coming of the Industrial Revolution. Thereafter the principal trade of the town for the 19th century was grain and timber, together with the range of trades to be found in a town which supported local agriculture. Records show that Aylsham had markets and fairs, certainly from the 13th century. Such weekly and annual events were important for the trade that they brought. Annual horse fairs would bring many other traders to the town, and the weekly market would be the occasion for more local trade. The rights of the stallholders in the market place today date back to the rights established in medieval times.

Aylsham was once noted for its spa, situated about half a mile south of the town; it comprised a chalybeate spring, formerly used by those suffering from asthma and other chronic conditions.

Local government

In medieval times the parish of Aylsham was established as four manors, the main manor of Lancaster, Vicarage manor, Sexton's manor and Bolwick manor. The ownership of the Lancaster manor changed hands many times, before James I assigned it to his son, the future Charles I.

In the course of the events which lead up to the English Civil War Charles I had to raise as much money as possible, and mortgaged Lancaster manor to the Corporation of the City of London. The Corporation eventually sold it to Sir John Hobart, and through him it passed to the ownership of the Blickling Estate. The current lords of the manor are the National Trust.

Formerly part of the South Erpingham Hundred, Aylsham was, for administrative purposes, absorbed into St. Faith's and Aylsham Rural District Council in 1894 and became part of Broadland District Council in 1974. Local issues come under the jurisdiction of Aylsham Town Council which is based at Aylsham Town Hall.

Parish church 

The Market Place and surrounding area is dominated by the tower of the parish church of St Michael and All Angels, a fine example of Gothic architecture of the Decorated style. The small spire on top of the 98 ft (30 metre) tower is also a landmark that can be seen for miles around. The nave, aisles and chancel were built in the 13th century. The tower and ground floor of the south porch were added in the 14th century. The north transept was built under the patronage of John of Gaunt, Duke of Lancaster around 1380. An upper floor to the porch was added in 1488. The lower part of the rood screen survived the destruction visited by Oliver Cromwell and the Puritans, although some of the painted panels were disfigured.

Transport

Roads
Road transport for Aylsham was very important. It was the principal coaching point on the Norwich-Cromer road and the meeting point for other roads. Each day, the coaches from Cromer and Holt would draw up at the Black Boys, the main inn in Aylsham market place. Coaching ended with the coming of the railways in the 1880s.

The town is now located on the A140 road, a route which runs between Ipswich and Cromer, via Norwich.

Buses
The town is served by a half-hourly bus service which runs between Norwich and Sheringham; this X44 route is operated by Sanders Coaches, which also provides other services in the area.

Railways
There were many different plans for railways, but eventually two lines served Aylsham, with the town having two railway stations.  Aylsham South was on the Great Eastern line between County School (near North Elmham) and Wroxham. Aylsham North was on the M&GNJR line from Melton Constable to Yarmouth. Both stations were closed in the 1950s.

Aylsham railway station is the northern terminus for the Bure Valley Railway, which was built on the site of Aylsham South station in 1990. The railway is a  minimum gauge heritage railway which runs to Wroxham; it is Norfolk's longest railway of less than standard gauge.

Several long distance footpaths with a railway theme start or pass through the town:
 Bure Valley Path runs alongside the railway line from Aylsham to Wroxham;
 Marriott's Way follows the old trackbed from Aylsham to Norwich, via the Themelthorpe Curve;
 Weaver's Way; starting in Cromer, much of this route follows the trackbed of the former line to Yarmouth.

Waterways
The ancient but natural transport route for Aylsham would have been the River Bure, but it was not open to substantial navigation. There was a scheme in the 18th century to widen the navigation from Coltishall to Aylsham and, after many difficulties, trading wherries from Great Yarmouth were able to reach a staithe at Aylsham. The end for this scheme was the devastating flood of 1912.

Aylsham today

Aylsham came fourth in the world in an international competition celebrating liveable communities, winning a Silver Award in category A (towns with a population up to 20,000) of the International Awards for Liveable Communities, held in La Coruña, Spain in November 2005.

The Market Towns Initiative finished in 2004, but the partnership successfully bid for funding to take part in the Cittaslow pilot project and to sustain work on traffic management and heritage. As a result, Aylsham became one of the founding towns and the first in Norfolk, of the Cittaslow movement, an international organisation promoting the concept of 'Slow Towns' ("a Network of towns where Quality of Life is important"). It is claimed that Aylsham did not have to change to become a member, as it was already a clear example of the type of community advocated by the Cittaslow movement.

Local entertainment in the town includes concerts by the Aylsham Band, which plays at venues in and around Aylsham. The Aylsham Players host one or two productions a year and Aylsham High School presents an annual school musical.

Aylsham also lies on the Weaver's Way which passes Blickling Hall; this is the great country house in the care of the National Trust, which is about a mile and a half (2 km) from Aylsham. With its dramatic symmetrical front, flanked by two great yew hedges, Blickling Hall is a fine example of a Jacobean brick-built manor house and was the home of the young Anne Boleyn.

The annual Aylsham Show features agricultural exhibits and takes place on August bank holiday Monday at nearby Blickling Park.

Aylsham Heritage Centre is located in a Victorian building within the grounds of St. Michael's Church. Archives stored at the centre can be used to research the town's past.

The town's Tesco store was built from wood, recyclable plastic and other sustainable materials; it claimed to be the "greenest in the world" opened in the town July 2008.

Notable residents
Thomas Hudson, a glover of Aylsham, is recorded as one of the Protestant martyrs condemned to death for his faith under the reign of Queen Mary, towards the end of her reign. He was burnt at the stake at the Lollard's Pit outside Bishopsgate, Norwich on 19 May 1558.

Sir Jerome Alexander (died 1670), a High Court judge in Ireland, noted for his exceptional severity, attended the local school c. 1600.

A plaque on the wall of Barclays Bank, now permanently closed, in the Market Place commemorates Christopher Layer (born 1683), who was a militant Jacobite and supporter of Prince Charles Edward Stuart, the 'Young Pretender'. He was tried for high treason and hanged at Tyburn in London in 1723. Nearby, a plaque commemorates Joseph Thomas Clover (1825–82), the father of modern anaesthetics, who was born above a shop overlooking the Market Place.

Daniel Defoe is thought to have stayed in Aylsham in 1723 during his journey through the eastern counties, and enjoyed a meal at the Black Boys Inn. Parson Woodforde, the famous Norfolk diarist, also dined there in 1781, and Horatio Nelson, whose cousin lived in Aylsham, is said to have danced in the Assembly Room attached to the inn.

Humphry Repton (1752–1818), the landscape gardener who lived at nearby Sustead, is buried in St Michael's Churchyard, and his watercolours provide a fascinating record of the Market Place in the early 19th century.

Kathleen Starling (1890–ca 1970) became an opera singer under the name of Kathleen Destournel. She sang at Covent Garden and entertained troops in North Africa during the Second World War, before moving to Arizona, USA until her husband's death after which she returned to Aylsham to live with her sisters.

Clive Payne (1950–), former professional footballer for Norwich City and AFC Bournemouth was born in Aylsham.

Nick Youngs (1959–) and his two sons, Ben (1989–) and Tom Youngs (1987–) were both brought up close to the town on their father's farm. Youngs is a former rugby union player for Leicester and England. Both sons went on to represent the national rugby union team. The Youngs brothers gifted land for a new sports ground to be built in the town.

Gallery

Twinning
Aylsham is twinned with 
  La Chaussée-Saint-Victor, Loir-et-Cher, France
and formerly had an informal connection with 
  Aylsham, Saskatchewan, Canada

See also
 List of closed railway stations in Britain
 Aylsham High School
 Cawston Road Mill, Aylsham

References

External links 

 Information from Genuki Norfolk on Aylsham
 

 
Market towns in Norfolk
Towns in Norfolk
Civil parishes in Norfolk
Broadland